Jawbreakers is an album by saxophonist Eddie "Lockjaw" Davis and trumpeter Harry "Sweets" Edison recorded in 1962 and released on the Riverside label.

Reception

The Allmusic site awarded the album 3 stars with the review by Scott Yanow stating, "Harry "Sweets" Edison and Eddie "Lockjaw" Davis always made for a logical combination for both had immediately recognizable sounds and could say an awful lot with one note... Easily recommended to straightahead jazz fans as are the later Sweets-Lockjaw recordings".

Track listing 
All compositions by Harry "Sweets" Edison except where noted
  "Oo-Ee!" - 5:15    
 "Broadway"  (Billy Bird, Teddy McRae, Henri Woode) - 5:20    
 "Jawbreakers" - 6:36    
 "Four" (Eddie "Cleanhead" Vinson) - 3:36    
 "Moolah" - 4:39    
 "A Gal in Calico" (Leo Robin, Arthur Schwartz) - 4:43    
 "I've Got a Crush on You" (George Gershwin, Ira Gershwin) - 5:55    
 "Close Your Eyes" (Bernice Petkere) - 5:34

Personnel 
Eddie "Lockjaw" Davis - tenor saxophone
Harry "Sweets" Edison - trumpet
Hugh Lawson - piano
 Ike Isaacs - bass
 Clarence Johnston - drums

References 

Eddie "Lockjaw" Davis albums
Harry Edison albums
1962 albums
Albums produced by Orrin Keepnews
Riverside Records albums